Oenopota convexigyra is a species of sea snail, a marine gastropod mollusk in the family Mangeliidae.

Description

Distribution
This species occurs in European waters off the Azores at depths of 3360 m.

References

 Bouchet, P. & A. Warén, 1980, Revision of the North-East Atlantic bathyal and abyssal Turridae. Journal of Molluscan Studies, supplement 8: 1 120
 Gofas, S.; Le Renard, J.; Bouchet, P. (2001). Mollusca, in: Costello, M.J. et al. (Ed.) (2001). European register of marine species: a check-list of the marine species in Europe and a bibliography of guides to their identification. Collection Patrimoines Naturels, 50: pp. 180–213
 Sysoev A.V. (2014). Deep-sea fauna of European seas: An annotated species check-list of benthic invertebrates living deeper than 2000 m in the seas bordering Europe. Gastropoda. Invertebrate Zoology. Vol.11. No.1: 134–155

External links
 
  MHNH: Oenopota convexigyra

convexigyra
Gastropods described in 1980